Agaricocrinus is a genus of extinct crinoids, belonging to the family Coelocrinidae.

These stationary upper-level epifaunal suspension feeders lived in the Carboniferous period and in the Osagean age of United States, from 353.8 to 345.0 Ma.

Selected species
Agaricocrinus americanus Roemer
Agaricocrinus splendens Miller and Gurley

Description
Like extant crinoids, Agaricocrinus species was anchored to a hard surface by a holdfast out of which grew an articulated stalk. On top of this was a calyx with a number of feather-like arms. Each arm bore short branches known as pinnules and from these cirri were extended which sifted plankton from the water flowing past.

References

Prehistoric crinoid genera
Carboniferous crinoids
Extinct animals of the United States